Sebastiaan Bremer (born 27 June 1970) is a Dutch artist who lives and works in New York City.

Bremer turns photographs, found or snapped, of himself and his family into trippy, dusty memories that reveal the subconscious and the real world in one blink of an eye.  He invents a poetic braille made up of text, personal symbols and ghostly shapes that, when integrated with their complex grounds, disappear again, buried in a sea of suspended dots.  By slowly and laboriously painting on top of quickly taken snapshots, Bremer slows down time to render a hauntingly beautiful interior landscape.

Work 
Born in Amsterdam, Bremer attended the open studio program at the Vrije Academie in The Hague from 1989 until 1991. During his early years he meticulously reproduced personal photographs in paint. He received the Werkbeurs Grant from FBKVB in the Netherlands and moved to New York in 1992 where he began to work primarily in black and white, reemphasizing his connection to photography. In 1994 he had his first solo show at Galerie Reisel in the Netherlands and began both exhibiting in group shows and curating them. He was assistant to several artists in New York, and worked on production for the photographers Inez van Lamsweerde and Vinoodh Matadin from 1996 until 2000. In 1998 he produced Liza May Post's 'Trying' film and photograph. In that same year he attended the Skowhegan School of Painting and Sculpture in Maine where he began experimenting with murals, collage paintings, and began drawing directly on photographs, the style which he continues to use today. In 1999 he finished his first large scale Ink on C-Print drawing entitled 10 AM-PM. In 2001 he had a solo debut, 'Veronica' at Roebling Hall, New York. His work is part of several important collections in the US and abroad, including the Victoria & Albert Museum, The MoMA, Zabludowicz Trust, the Rabobank collection and Lodeveans Contemporary LLP.

A new solo exhibition of his work opened May 2, 2008 in Galerie Barbara Thumm, Berlin. Currently he is working on a small edition of jewelry with Moritz Glik for Karen LaGatta editions, a commission for the Rabobank in the Netherlands and new works for various upcoming group shows, as well as an upcoming solo show at Mia Sundberg Galleri in Stockholm.

Selected exhibitions 
Source:

Solo exhibitions 
2008
 Solo show at Voltahalle, Hales Gallery, Basel
 Cold Turkey, Galerie Barbara Thumm, Berlin, DEU

2006
 Kraaij, Hales Gallery, London, UK
 Sebastiaan Bremer, Roebling Hall, NY, NY, USA

2005
 Sub Neblina Use Luz Baixa, Gemeente Museum, The Hague, NLD
 Galica, Milan, ITA

2004
 Seething, Lying And Other Work, Satellite, NY, NY, USA
 Monkey, Air de Paris, Paris, FR

2003
 Sebastiaan Bremer, 303 Gallery at White Box, Mari Spirito curator, NY, NY, USA
 Vanishing Point, Roebling Hall, Brooklyn, NY, USA
 You’ve Made Your Mother Cry, Galerie Barbara Thumm, Berlin, DEU

2002
 Janus, Schaper Sundberg Gallery, Stockholm, SWE
 Sebastiaan Bremer, Ybakatu Gallery, Curitiba, BRA

2001
 Veronica, Roebling Hall, Brooklyn, NY, USA
 Hotel Lydmar, curated by Thomas Nordanstad, Stockholm, SWE

2000
 Melanchromia, Ybakatu Gallery, Curitiba, BRA

1994
 Sebastiaan Bremer, Gallery Reisel, Rotterdam, NLD

Group exhibitions 

2008
 When it’s a photograph, curated by Soo Kim, Bolsky Gallery, Otis College of Art and Design, Los Angeles, CA, USA
 MULTIVERSE, curated by Pilar Tompkins, Claremont Museum of Art, CA, USA
 Your Documents Please, MAC-Itami, Japan
 Versions of Reality, curated by Lee Stoetzel, selections from the West Collection, NEXT, Chicago
 When it's a photograph, curated by Soo Kim, Bolsky Gallery, Los Angeles, CA, USA
 Passed as present, York Art Gallery, York, UK

2007
 Inaugural show, Mia Sundberg Galeri, Stockholm, SWE
 In het woud - op zoek naar betekenis, Armando Museum, Amersfoort, NLD
 Photoplus, curated by Lilly Wei,  Blue Star Contemporary Art Center, TX, USA
 Out of True, Byblos Gallery, Verona, ITA
 The End Begins, curated by Gil Hedley, selections from the Lodevans Collection, London, UK
 Unseen, Roebling Hall, Chelsea, NY, USA
 ICPNY Selections 2007, curated by James Siena, ICPNY, USA
 The Photograph as Canvas, curated by Stephen Maine, The Aldrich Museum of Contemporary Art, Ridgefield, CT, USA

2006
 Out of True, curated by Micaela Giovannotti & Joyce Korotkin, part of Art Basel Miami
 I Walk the Lines, Galerie Barbara Thumm, Berlin, DEU

2005
 Stay Inside, Shoshanna Wayne Gallery, LA, USA

2004
 Is One Thing Better Than Another? Galerie Aurel Scheibler, Cologne, DEU
 Pin-Up: Contemporary Collage and Drawing, Tate Modern, London, UK
 Sugar Hiccup, Taka Ishii Gallery, Tokyo, JPN
 Curious Crystals of Unusual Purity, PS1/MoMA, curated by Bob Nickas Queens, NY, USA
 Drawn/Quartered, Southeastern Center for Contemporary Art, Winston-Salem, NC, USA
 Off the Wall: Works from the JP Morgan Chase Collection, Bruce Museum, Greenwich, CT, USA
 Open House: Working in Brooklyn, Brooklyn Museum, Brooklyn, NY, USA
 Home Extension, Albany University Museum, curated by Gregory Volk and Sabine Russ, Albany, NY, USA

2003
 Obsession, Galica, curated by L. M. Barbero, Milan, ITA
 Game Over, Grimm Rosenfeld Gallery, Munich, DEU
 The Ballroom Show, Gimm- Eis Gallery, Copenhagen, DNK
 Some Panoramas, Pump House Gallery, curated by Paul Hedge, London, UK
 The Photography Gallery, Victoria & Albert Museum permanent collection, London, UK
 Ybakatu Gallery, Curitiba, BRA
 Far Away, So Close, Clare Weiss Fine Arts, New York, NY, USA
 Group Show, Mia Sundberg Galleri, Stockholm, SWE
 Water, Water, Rotunda Gallery, curated by Lily Wei, Brooklyn, NY, USA

2002
 Paris/Brooklyn, Filles du Calvaire, Paris, FRA
 Transformer II, Air de Paris, curated by Inez van Lamsweerde, Paris, FRA
 Quase Desenho, Adriana Penteado, São Paulo, BRA
 Recent Works, Zabriskie Gallery, New York, NY, USA

2001
 Fast Fwd: Miami, Roebling Hall, Miami, FL, US
 Song Poems, Cohen, Leslie & Brown, curated by Steven Hull, New York, NY, USA

2000
 Figured Out, Spencer Brownstone Gallery, New York, NY, US
 Groupshow, Bellwether Gallery, Brooklyn, USA
 Lightness, Marcello Marvelli Fine Arts, New York, NY, USA
 Aspects of Contemporary Landscape, Marcello Marvelli Fine Arts, New York, NY, USA
 MeatMarket Art Fair, Roebling Hall, New York, NY, USA
 White, Nicolai Fine Arts, curated by Irina Popiashvili, New York, NY, USA
 3D, Zingmagazine, New York, NY, USA
 Polar Bear In A Snow Storm, Mills Gallery, Boston Center for the Arts, Boston, MA, USA

1999
 Sebastiaan Bremer/Vince Szarek Gallery Untitled, curated by Steven Cochran, Dallas, TX, USA
 The Stroke, Exit Art, curated by Shahzia Sikander, New York, NY, USA
 Blueprint, Spark Gallery, New York, NY, USA
 Anti –World, Gallery Untitled, curated by Marcos Rosales, Dallas, TX, USA

1998
 Bank Holiday, Skowhegan School of Painting and Sculpture, Skowhegan, ME, USA
 Imagination Dead Imagine, Silverstein Gallery, New York, NY, USA

1996
 The Art Market, Gen Art, New York, NY, USA

1995
 Thicket on the Lamb, Thicket Gallery, New York, NY, USA

1992
 Protectors, Bloom Gallery, Amsterdam, NLD

Collections 
His work is part of several important collections in the US and abroad, including the Victoria & Albert Museum, The MoMA, Zabludowicz Trust, the Rabobank Collection and Lodeveans Contemporary LLP.

References

External links 
 Sebastiaan Bremer's website
 Sebastiaan Bremer reviewed in The New York Times
 Sebastiaan Bremer reviewed in Art in America
 Sebastiaan Bremer reviewed in Harper's magazine
 Sebastiaan Bremer reviewed in The Brooklyn Rail
 Sebastiaan Bremer reviewed in Art Lies
 Sebastiaan Bremer is represented by the Hales Gallery in London
 Sebastiaan Bremer at Roebling Hall
 Sebastiaan Bremer at the Lower East Side Printshop
 Sebastiaan Bremer in The Volta Show, NY
 Sebastiaan Bremer's drawings featured on lostateminor.com 
 Sebastiaan Bremer on artfacts.net

1970 births
Artists from Amsterdam
Dutch artists
Living people
Skowhegan School of Painting and Sculpture alumni